"Gotta Get Mine" is a song performed by American rappers MC Breed and Tupac Shakur. It was released on June 3, 1993, through Wrap Records with distribution via Ichiban Records, as a lead single from MC Breed's second solo studio album The New Breed. Its lyrics were written by Breed, 2Pac and The D.O.C., and the music was composed by Colin Wolfe and Warren G. It was produced by Warren G, Colin Wolfe and MC Breed.

The single peaked at number 96 on the Billboard Hot 100, at number 61 on the Hot R&B/Hip-Hop Songs and at number 6 on the Hot Rap Songs in the United States, making it the second MC Breed's successful single after 1991 "Ain't No Future in Yo' Frontin'.

The song was later included in MC Breed's 1995 greatest hits album The Best of Breed, and was featured in the soundtrack to the 1998 film Ringmaster and in the 2002 film 8 Mile. It was also remixed for MC Breed's seventh studio album It's All Good.

Track listing

Personnel 

 Eric Tyrone Breed – lyrics, vocals, producer
 Tupac Amaru Shakur – lyrics & vocals (tracks: 1, 2)
 Admiral D – lyrics & vocals (track 3)
 Dale "Jibri" Jabrigar – lyrics & vocals (track 3)
 Black Caesar – lyrics & vocals (track 3)
 Colin Fitzroy Wolfe – music, producer
 Warren Griffin III – music, producer
 Tracy Lynn Curry – lyrics (tracks: 1, 2)
 Jimmy O'Neill – mixing (track 1)
 Earl – engineering
 FPD3 – art direction, design

Charts

References

External links 

1993 singles
Hip hop songs
Tupac Shakur songs
Songs written by The D.O.C.
Songs written by Tupac Shakur
1993 songs
Songs written by Warren G